Gabriela König (born 8 October 1952 in Osnabrück) is a German politician for the Free Democratic Party.

She joined the Lower Saxon Landtag in 2005 as a replacement for Carsten Lehmann, and has been re-elected on one occasion.

References

Free Democratic Party (Germany) politicians
Members of the Landtag of Lower Saxony
Women members of State Parliaments in Germany
1952 births
Living people
21st-century German women politicians